John and Gillian, a young brother and sister, are characters in the TV Comic strip based on the long-running British science fiction television series Doctor Who.

Comic appearances 
The stories featuring them were drawn first by Neville Main, then by Bill Mevin, and finally by John Canning. They first appeared in the story The Klepton Parasites (Issues 674 to 683). They began by looking for their grandfather, the Doctor, in a junkyard. This paralleled the events of the television series' first episode "An Unearthly Child", although in the strip, the junkyard was at No. 16 instead of No. 76.

Storylines 
The Doctor does not seem to have met them prior to their first appearance, but they are aware of him as being an "inventor or something" and he identifies them as soon as they entered the TARDIS, saying, "You must be John and Gillian..." This lack of surprise on his part indicates his awareness of the possibility of them turning up at some point. During their visit, John playfully touches a control button and transports them to the 30th century, where they help the peaceful Thains to defeat a race of alien invaders, the Kleptons. At the end of the tale, it seems that the Doctor is about to make an attempt to return his grandchildren to the 20th century, but this is not taken up in the second story, which commences with a crash-landing for the three on an asteroid and goes on to tell their involvement in the quest for a moss with medicinal qualities.

John and Gillian travel with the Doctor for many adventures and fight against many enemies, including the villainous "Great Ixa", the space pirate Captain Anastas Thrax, the ant-like Zarbi (from the televised story The Web Planet), the spherical Gyros robots, and even the Pied Piper in what amounted to a sequel to Robert Browning's famous poem. A later story introduces the Trods, cone-shaped robotic creatures that ran on static electricity, created for the strip by artist John Canning as surrogate Daleks, since the latter could not at that time be used as Terry Nation had sold the rights to the Doctor's arch-enemies elsewhere; namely, City Publications' TV Century 21. After TV21's comic strip The Daleks came to an end, Polystyle Publications obtained the rights, and the Daleks swept onto the front cover of issue 788 of TV Comic in the first instalment of The Trodos Ambush, in which they massacre the Trods.

John and Gillian, who now appear to be teenagers, remain with the Doctor until the first part of Invasion of the Quarks (issues 872 to 876), when the Doctor enrolls them in the galactic university on the planet Zebadee. This is their last appearance in the TV Comic strip.

References 

Comics characters introduced in 1964
Doctor Who comic strip characters
Doctor Who spin-off companions
Female characters in comics
Fictional duos
Male characters in comics
Sibling duos